Yamila Flor (born 7 January 1973) is a Cuban softball player. She competed in the women's tournament at the 2000 Summer Olympics.

References

External links
 

1973 births
Living people
Cuban softball players
Olympic softball players of Cuba
Softball players at the 2000 Summer Olympics
People from Las Tunas (city)